Govan Old Parish Church is the name of the original parish church serving Govan in Glasgow from the 5th or 6th century AD until 2007. In that year, the Church of Scotland united the two Govan congregations with Linthouse and established the parish church at Govan Cross, making Govan Old redundant.

Govan Old is no longer used for regular Sunday services, but the building remains a place of worship with a daily morning service and is open to visitors in the afternoons. The church, dedicated to a Saint Constantine, occupies a Scottish Gothic Revival building of national significance (A-Listed by Historic Environment Scotland) within a churchyard designated a Scheduled Ancient Monument (Historic Environment Scotland).

The church houses an internationally-significant collection of early medieval sculpture, known as the Govan Stones. All the carved stones come from the churchyard and include the Govan Sarcophagus, four upstanding crosses with figurative and interlace decoration, five Anglo-Scandinavian hogbacks, and a wide range of recumbent burial monuments, all seemingly dating to the 9th - 11th centuries AD.

Govan Old and the Govan Stones museum are open daily between April 1st and October 31st from 1pm-4pm (visitors can contact the museum to arrange tours in the off season). Admission to the museum is free, although there is the option for visitors to make donations, and a small gift shop inside including books and local handicrafts which raises money for the upkeep of the property and its collections.

Creation of the site
It is believed that the site's earliest Christian activity began sometime in the 5th or 6th century AD. Archaeological excavations in the 1990s uncovered two early Christian burials beneath the foundations of a later church; these burials were radiocarbon-dated between the 5th and 6th centuries AD (AD 435-601 and AD 474 -601).

Despite this early activity, it wasn't until the 9th and 10th centuries that Govan Old rose to prominence: indeed, there are few historical references to Govan in the interim, though there appears to be one reference included in Symeon of Durham's Historia Regum, compiled sometime in the 12th century AD. In it, Simeon records the return of the Northumbrian army from 'Ovania' after attacking Dumbarton Rock (Alt Clut) in AD 756.
Originally, the Annals of Ulster recorded Dumbarton Rock as the centre of the Brittonic Kingdom of Alt Clud (usually pre-emptively referred to as the Kingdom of Strathclyde, but which is more accurately described as ‘the kingdom of the Rock of the Clyde’) from the 6th century AD until the later 9th century AD. In AD 870, the annals record a Viking raid on Dumbarton Rock; after this point, the kings of Clyde Rock are no longer discussed.  In 872, the Annals of Ulster instead refer to the kingdom of Ystrad Clud, better known as the Kingdom of Strathclyde, which appears to mark the shift of political power from Dumbarton Rock further upstream to Govan.
It is possible that a predecessor of the 12th-century royal estate at Partick and the now-destroyed Doomster Hill (which is thought to have functioned as a Viking-style 'thing' site or moot/meeting place, having been adapted from a possible Bronze-Age burial mound) played a part in this power shift.

The size of the graveyard and the sheer amount of early medieval sculpture suggest that the church was supported by royal patronage. Because the site has been in continual use since it was first established, it is impossible to tell what the original church looked like, but it is clear that it always had Christian associations.

Building

Govan Old Parish Church is an ornate, Category A listed building of significant architectural merit, designed by Robert Rowand Anderson and influenced by features at Pluscarden Abbey near Elgin.

The majority of the current church building was constructed 1884-1888, although the site is one of the oldest places of Christian worship in Scotland. Unusually, the axis of the church was turned to orientate north-south rather than the traditional east-west orientation, but this allowed the main door to face south to the main street.

Upon construction, the congregation was closely associated with the Scoto-Catholic High Church movement within the Church of Scotland—several former ministers have been actively involved with the Scottish Church Society. Notable former ministers include the Reverend George MacLeod, later the Lord MacLeod of Fuinary, and Norman Shanks, Leader of the Iona Community from 1995 to 2002.

Govan Old also has noteworthy stained glass windows. Two of the church's windows were given by Robert Malcolm Kerr; the Emmaus window in 1891, and Christ blessing the children in 1902. Both were made by Heaton, Butler and Bayne.

The church's museum collection of early medieval Christian carvings, known as the Govan Stones, is of international significance. This was first properly recognised in December 1855 when the digging of a grave led to the rediscovery of a sarcophagus.

The exciting discovery prompted scholars to illustrate and record the Govan Sarcophagus and other early medieval monuments in the churchyard. A photographic record of forty-six carved stones was commissioned and published by John Stirling Maxwell.  For this publication, Robert Foster of Stirling made plaster casts of each of the stones; these casts were then taken to the studio of renowned photographers T & R Annan & Son and photographed in ideal lighting conditions to emphasise the carving. These photographs were used in the J. Romilly Allen and Joseph Anderson's Early Christian Monuments of Scotland, though only thirty-nine were included in their volume; however, of these thirty-nine, one stone was not recorded by Stirling Maxwell, which puts the number of probable early medieval stones from Govan at forty-seven.

In the 1960s, Ralegh Radford saw the stones as a means to understand Govan's early significance and made close comparisons between the carved stones from Govan and those found at Inchinnan, which, along with other monuments in the region, are described as belonging to a ‘Govan School’ of carving.

Today, thirty monuments are currently on display inside the church, and a single recumbent monument of medieval date remains in the graveyard. Sixteen of the stones that were not brought into the church were thought to have been buried or removed after the demolition of the Harland & Wolff factory building in 1973, but a recent community archaeology dig identified the location of at least three of the lost stones.

Of the thirty-one monuments on display at Govan Old, there is one sarcophagus, two cross-shafts, two upright cross-slabs, five hogbacks, and twenty-one recumbent cross-slabs.

Govan Sarcophagus
The Govan Sarcophagus is a monumental stone coffin with an ornately carved exterior; it was rediscovered when the sexton was digging a grave in the south-east corner of the churchyard in December 1855, surrounded by roots from two elm trees. No human remains were found with the sarcophagus, so it is thought that it was buried at an earlier date to protect the monument, perhaps during the Scottish Reformation when iconoclasm was common practice. Today, the sarcophagus is on display in the modern Govan Old museum, known as the Govan Stones.

The sarcophagus is supposed to have been dedicated to the patron saint of the church, St Constantine. There is much debate over which Constantine is the patron, and whether it is Constantine of Strathclyde, but most scholars agree that the coffin most likely would have been dedicated to Constantine f. Kenneth (AD 862–878) or Donald f. Constantine (AD 889–900). Because of its highly-decorated exterior, it is assumed that the coffin was meant to display the remains of the saint as a focal piece in the church.

The coffin itself depicts Insular iconography, taking inspiration from different styles that were then popular in the Irish Sea Region. One face of the sarcophagus shows a hunting scene of a horseman chasing a stag, perhaps accompanied by a dog, a motif frequently used in Pictish art that is thought to convey an association with royalty and power. The sarcophagus also shows an animal trampling another two creatures: a snake and what may be a wolf; the angular decoration of the triumphant animal has led many scholars to suggest that this is a ‘Lamb of God’ motif. Two panels depicting beasts in various configurations are found on the other long face of the sarcophagus: in one, four ‘beasts’ are pseudo-mirrored across the vertical and horizontal axes of the panel, though there are differences in each beast's design. In the second panel, two long-necked animals cross necks and interlace their tongue/ears with the other beast's tail; similar motifs, where beasts cross legs, necks, or other body parts, can also be found in Pictish sculpture. The rest of the space on the sarcophagus is filled with panels of median-incised interlace, some of which represent snakes, which a relatively common motif in Insular sculpture, thought to be a symbol of death and resurrection.

Crosses and upright cross-slabs
Two cross-shafts and two upright cross-slabs are on display in the Govan Old museum. The two cross-shafts include the iconic Jordanhill Cross, also known as the Govan Cross, and the ‘Inverted (or Upside Down) Cross’. These would have been decorated on all four faces and, when whole, would have been part of a free-standing cross, probably in a form similar to the more intact Barochan Cross, now housed at Paisley Museum.

The Jordanhill cross is so named because it was gifted to the residents of Jordanhill House at some point when one of the churches was being replaced, though there are conflicting accounts as to when this took place. It was brought back to Govan Old in 1928. The cross is decorated with different variants of median-incised interlace, though its most notable feature is an eroded man on horseback that has lost much of its detail apart from the eyes of both horse and man.

The ‘Inverted’ or ‘Upside Down’ cross is so named because it is currently displayed upside down next to the hogback stones in the (ecclesiastical) north transept. Though most of the details on the broad faces of the cross have been damaged or eroded, the two smaller faces are comparatively well-preserved. These are mostly decorated with median-incised interlace, though this also retains the only figural sculpture that can be interpreted as a biblical scene – possibly David being anointed by Samuel.

The two upright cross-slabs include the 'Sun Stone' and the 'Cuddy Stane'. The 'Sun Stone' is heavily eroded, but it is decorated with a large boss from which emerge four snakes, arranged in such a way that it appears sun-like, above an angular interlace panel. On the other broad face it is decorated with a cross, median-incised interlace, and a rider on one face. Though there is a tenon on top of the stone slab, some scholars have argued this was to small to have supported a (stone) cross-head and could indicate that the Sun Stone played an architectural function.

The 'Cuddy Stane' takes its name from its rider's steed, which appears more like a donkey than a horse. The stone has been damaged since it was illustrated in 1856, which records the rider's upper half, with probable sword and pony tail, and the tenon joint for the presumed cross-head. While the stone appears plain today, this is because it has been severely eroded and was also reused as an Early Modern grave cover with carved initials; hints of a panel of interlace are preserved under the horseman.

Hogbacks
Hogbacks are recumbent stone monuments found across Scotland and Northern England that date to the 10th or 11th centuries AD; the term 'hogback' was established prior to 1885 to describe the characteristic curved ridge of the monument. Hogbacks are often decorated with rows of tegulation on the broad faces and each end often sports stylised or naturalistic beasts, though there is substantial variation on these traits from monument to monument. The tegulation has led many to argue that hogbacks are meant to emulate a house-shape, specifically Scandinavian long houses.

Five hogbacks are housed at Govan Old, the largest collection of hogbacks in Scotland; four of these are the largest known hogbacks in all of Great Britain. The smallest of the hogbacks (SM 2, ECMS 2, Lang 1) is the best preserved and exhibits the most decoration; it has been suggested that this style has similarities to sculpture in Cumbria. Two of the hogbacks have each been re-cut to resemble a single beast, though it is unclear when this took place. Three of the hogbacks have concave tegulation, while the other two exhibit straight-sided 'shingles'.

Recumbent cross-slabs
The recumbent cross-slabs take up the largest proportion of the collection at Govan Old; twenty-one of the originally recorded thirty-seven are on display, arranged around the interior walls of the church. Unfortunately, these monuments have received less attention relative to the others because they have been differentially worn and liberally reused since at least the 17th century. While the cross-slabs vary in size, in shape and in the decorative motifs used, there are some features they share. They each exhibit a cross with an incised border, which consistently divides the stone into at least two panels. For each stone, there is a plain border that defines the edge of the monument. Finally, of the twenty-one recumbent cross-slabs on display, at least five show evidence for a regionally significant feature known as 'angle-knobs'.

These tombstones are of particular importance to any future tourism development and hold great potential.

Amalgamation
Following arbitration, the Church of Scotland's Presbytery of Glasgow decided upon a union of the three local Church of Scotland congregations in the Govan area. Govan Old (along with the charges of Linthouse St Kenneth and New Govan) was terminated on 28 October 2007, becoming part of Govan and Linthouse parish and congregation.

After 2007, the future of the Govan Old Parish Church was uncertain. In 2008, an Options Appraisal study was undertaken by Govan Workspace Ltd, who then took the lead in applying for funding to redisplay the sculpture. The funding was secured in 2011, allowing the redisplay to be completed by Northlight Heritage/York Archaeological Trust in 2013. Govan Old's future was secured when the Govan Heritage Trust obtained a grant from the Scottish Government in 2016. The Trust aims to develop the church into a self-sustaining community-run cultural, museum and business complex, but requires further financial support to bring to fruition.

The former minister of the Govan and Linthouse Parish Church was Rev Dr Moyna McGlynn, who passed away in August 2016.

The church is located near Govan Station on the Glasgow Subway. Its main entrance is next to the Govan War Memorial, which is to the immediate west of the Pearce Institute on the Govan Road.

Archaeology 
The Channel 4 archeology programme Time Team dug in the graveyard of the Govan Old Parish Church in the fourth episode of series 4, recorded in summer 1996 and broadcast early 1997.

In March 2019, ′Stones and Bones′ community archaeologists with a schoolboy named Mark McGettigan revealed long-lost medieval stone carvings. The stones were assumed to have been demolished by chance when the neighbouring Harland & Wolff shipyard plaring shed was demolished in the 1970s.

“This the most exciting discovery we have had at Govan in the last 20 years. The Govan Stones are a collection of international importance and these recovered stones reinforce the case for regarding Govan as a major early medieval centre of power", said Professor Stephen Driscoll.

Notable ministers
Andrew Melville 1577-1580
Thomas Smeaton 1580-1584
Patrick Sharp (theologian) 1585-1614
Robert Boyd (university principal) 1615-1621
Hugh Binning 1650-1653
Very Rev Matthew Leishman DD 1794-1874), father of Thomas Leishman, Matthew was Moderator of the General Assembly of the Church of Scotland in 1858, was minister of the parish 1821 to 1874, a remarkable 53 years.
George MacLeod 1930-1938 when he left Govan in 1938 he founded the Iona Community
David Orr (1960–80), whose efforts led to the establishment of the Govan Housing Association.
Tom Davidson Kelly (1989-2002) established the Friends of Govan Old and brought attention to the early medieval sculpture at Govan by persuading scholars to consider the collection at a conference in 1992.
Moyna McGlynn (2008-2016) maintained the building after its closure and supported the old congregation, allowing time for a community-based trust to assume responsibility for the site.

See also 
List of Church of Scotland parishes

References

External links 
The Govan Stones
Website of the former Govan Old Parish Church
The 'Celtic Interlace' stones at Govan.
The 'Viking Hogback' stones and the 'Govan Sarcophagus'- video, narration and annotation.
News report in the Glasgow Evening Times
Govan and Linthouse Parish Church
Govan Old Parish Church history - Clyde Waterfront Heritage
Govan Old Parish Church – CANMORE Record, Historic Environment Scotland

Protestant churches converted from Roman Catholicism
Rebuilt churches in the United Kingdom
Churches completed in 1888
19th-century churches in the United Kingdom
Category A listed buildings in Glasgow
Govan
Listed churches in Glasgow
Govan